The men's K-2 500 metres event was a pairs kayaking event conducted as part of the Canoeing at the 1984 Summer Olympics program.

Medalists

Results

Heats
21 crews were entered into the event on August 6. The top three finishers from each of the heats advanced directly to the semifinals while the remaining teams were relegated to the repechages.

Repechages
The 12 crews first raced in two repechages on August 6. The top three finishers from each of the repechages advanced directly to the semifinals.

Semifinals
The top three finishers in each of the semifinals (raced on August 8) advanced to the final.

Final
The final was held on August 10.

References
1984 Summer Olympics official report Volume 2, Part 2. p. 365. 
Sport-reference.com 1984 men's K-2 500 m results

Men's K-2 500
Men's events at the 1984 Summer Olympics